Leo Greiml (born 3 July 2001) is an Austrian professional footballer who plays as a defender for Bundesliga club Schalke 04.

Career
On 11 May 2018, Greiml signed with Rapid Wien. He made his professional debut with Rapid Wien in a 2–1 Austrian Bundesliga loss to Sturm Graz on 30 May 2019.

On 13 April 2022, he agreed to join Schalke 04 on a free transfer for the 2022–23 season, signing a three-year contract. He made his first team debut for Schalke in the Bundesliga on  10 September 2022, coming on as a substitute in the 87th minute in a 3–1 home win against VfL Bochum.

Career statistics

Club

References

External links

 Profile at the FC Schalke 04 website
 
 OEFB Profile

2001 births
Living people
People from Horn, Austria
Footballers from Lower Austria
Austrian footballers
Association football defenders
Austria youth international footballers
Austrian Football Bundesliga players
Bundesliga players
Regionalliga players
SK Rapid Wien players
FC Schalke 04 players
FC Schalke 04 II players